Anna Valentina Murch (7 December 1948 – 26 March 2014) was a British artist who was based in San Francisco. She was known for her award-winning public art installations.

Early life and education
Anna Valentina Murch was born in Dumbarton, Scotland, the only child of Norman Robbins Murch and Valentina Gordikova Murch. Her father was a naval commander, and ran a charity for women and children after he retired. Her mother was from St. Petersburg; the Murches met in Shanghai during World War II. Her mother became an actress in London; she played Annushka in a film adaptation of Anna Karenina (1948), released in the year Murch was born.

Murch was raised in London. She attended Croydon College of Art, earned an art degree from the University of Leicester, and gained two postgraduate degrees at the Royal College of Art, and the Architectural Association in London.

Career 
In 1976 Murch moved to San Francisco and had a live-work studio at Project Artaud. She taught at the San Francisco Art Institute and at the University of California, Berkeley. She taught at Mills College from 1992, and held the Joan Danforth Chair of Studio Art there from 2005 to 2007. In 1990 she had a residency at the Exploratorium.

Murch's work often involved large urban spaces, stations, plazas and bridges, and installations that created plays of light, water, and sound. In Miami she designed Water Scores, a public plaza with inclined waterfalls. She was part of a team that was commissioned to help with the design of the St. Louis Metro. The design recycled 160,000 pounds of colored glass to "create a shifting, ephemeral light show". One of her last designs was Archipelago, a courtyard for the trauma center at San Francisco General Hospital.

In 2010, Murch gave an oral history interview to the Archives of American Art.

Notable works
Waterscape (installed in front of San Jose City Hall)
Skytones (Seattle)
Confluences (Seattle)
River Wrap (Portland)
Oasis (Brea, California)
Umbra (Charlotte, North Carolina)
Archipelago (San Francisco)
Folded Light (Santa Fe)
Light Passage (St. Louis)

Personal life 
In 1988, Murch married to fellow environmental artist Doug Hollis. She died in San Francisco in 2014, aged 65 years, from cancer.

References

External links 
  
Louise Steinman, "Anna the Almaziful: Remembering Anna Valentina Murch" The Crooked Mirror (31 December 2014), a blogpost in memory of Murch.

Scottish emigrants to the United States
2014 deaths
1948 births
Alumni of the Royal College of Art
Artists from San Francisco
Scottish women artists
Alumni of the University of Leicester
University of California, Berkeley faculty
Mills College faculty
San Francisco Art Institute faculty